Conrad Lam Kui-shing (born 24 November 1935 in Hong Kong with family root in Shunde, Guangdong) was the founding member of the United Democrats of Hong Kong. He was a member of the Legislative Council from 1985 to 1988 and 1991 to 1995 and Wong Tai Sin District Board member.

References
 Kwok, Rowena Y.F. (Dec 1991). "Kowloon Central: The Constituency, the People and the Candidates". Asian Journal of Public Administration 13 (2): 39-54.
 Database on LegCo members

1935 births
Living people
District councillors of Wong Tai Sin District
United Democrats of Hong Kong politicians
Democratic Party (Hong Kong) politicians
Hong Kong medical doctors
HK LegCo Members 1985–1988
HK LegCo Members 1991–1995